Inga Markovits (born 1937 in Germany) is an American lawyer, and The Friends of Joe Jamail Regents Chair, at the University of Texas.
She is the recipient of the 2012 Ellen Maria Gorrisen Berlin Prize and is a Fellow at the American Academy in Berlin.

Works
 Imperfect Justice: An East-West German Diary, Oxford University Press, 1995, ; Clarendon Press, 1995, 

"Selective Memory: How the Law Affects What We Remember and Forget About the Past. The Case of East Germany", 35 Law & Society Review 513, 2002
 "Justice in Lüritz", 50 American Journal of Comparative Law 819, 2002

References

External links

https://archive.today/20121211163954/http://www.utexas.edu/law/magazine/tag/inga-markovits/
http://www.bsos.umd.edu/gvpt/lpbr/subpages/reviews/markovit.htm
https://web.archive.org/web/20120426001301/http://wmlawreview.org/files/MARKOVITS.pdf

American lawyers
University of Texas faculty
Berlin Prize recipients
Living people
1937 births
American women lawyers
American women academics
21st-century American women